The Richfield Reaper is a weekly newspaper serving the people of south central Utah, printed and published in Richfield, Utah, United States. Its primary areas of coverage include Sevier, Wayne and Piute counties, but is also read in homes in Sanpete and Garfield counties. Available on newsstands Tuesday evenings, it is published and delivered via the US Postal Service on Wednesday. 

The Reaper was started by Joe Thompson in 1885, and has been publishing continuously in one form or another ever since. As the voice of south central Utah, it has been involved in numerous community issues. The publication has earned many awards from the Utah Press Association, as well as the Brehm Communications Better Newspaper Contest.

In addition to printing The Richfield Reaper and Reaper Extra, the printing plant located at The Reaper office also serves the printing needs for a variety of clients, including other community newspapers, special sections, and high school and college publications. Among those are Sun Advocate, Price; Emery County Progress, Castle Dale; Smart Shopper, Price and Castle Dale; The Insider, Wayne County and Garfield County; Sanpete Messenger, Manti and Gunnison Valley editions; Salina Sun, Salina; The Times-News, Nephi; The Millard County Gazette, Delta; Gunnison Valley Gazette, Gunnison; and The Mainstreet Business Journal, Washington.

References

External links
 Official website

Newspapers published in Utah
Sevier County, Utah